Sauk Centre is the name of the two following places, both of which are found in the United States:

Sauk Centre, Minnesota
Sauk Centre Township, Stearns County, Minnesota